When I Was Young (or When I Was Young: Children's Songs from Ireland) is a collaboration between Irish musicians Len Graham, Garry Ó Briain and Pádraigín Ní Uallacháin. It is the third studio album from Ní Uallacháin, her second collaboration with Ó Briain, and Graham's eleventh studio album. The album was released on the Gael Linn label.

Track listing
Johnny When You Die
Dazzledance
Soldier, Soldier
The Field Mouse's Ball
The Wheel of Fortune
As I Roved Out
The Fox & The Hare
Rosemary Fair
Early in the Morning
Henry My Son
Old Roger Rum
My Aunt Jane
Frost Is All over/Daisy Chain
The Magical Band
The Golden Ball
Do You Love an Apple
The Old Woman & The Beggar
Weelia Weelia Wallia
Cause He Was a Fool
The Willow Tree
Fair Rosa
I Once Had a Granny
Pack of Tailors/Baggy Britches
The Frog's Wedding
The False Knight
Dreamtime
Morning Willie
I Know Where I'm Going

Personnel 
Len Graham – Arranger, Performer, Vocals
Garry Ó Briain – Arranger, Guitar, Keyboards, Mandolin, Performer, Producer
Pádraigín Ní Uallacháin – Arranger, Performer, Vocals
Paul Brady – Liner Notes
Ronan Browne – Flute, Pipe, Whistle (Instrument)
Nollaig Casey – Fiddle, Viola
Catherine Considine – Engineer
Tom Hayes – Percussion
Frances Lambe – Paintings
Martin Murray – Mixing
Máirtín O'Connor – Accordion

References

External links
 When I Was Young - official website

1997 albums
Pádraigín Ní Uallacháin albums
Len Graham (singer) albums